The Women's sprint event of the Biathlon World Championships 2015 was held on 7 March 2015.

Results
The race was started at 17:30 EET.

References

Women's sprint
2015 in Finnish women's sport